is a railway station of the Chūō Main Line, operated by East Japan Railway Company (JR East) in the Kasugai-Betsuden neighborhood of the city of Fuefuki, Yamanashi Prefecture, Japan.

Lines
Kasugaichō Station is served by the Chūō Main Line, and is 125.0 kilometers from the terminus of the line at Tokyo Station.

Station layout
The station consists of two opposed ground level  side platforms serving two tracks, connected by a level crossing. The station is unattended.

Platforms

History 
The station has been unattended since 1 October 1970. With the dissolution and privatization of JNR on 1 April 1987, the station came under the control of the East Japan Railway Company. The station was given its present name on 1 April 1993. Automated turnstiles using the Suica IC Card system came into operation on 16 October 2004.

Passenger statistics
In fiscal 2010, the station was used by an average of 510 passengers daily (boarding passengers only).
|}

Surrounding area
 former Kasugai town hall
 Kasugai Elementary School

See also
 List of railway stations in Japan

References

 Miyoshi Kozo. Chuo-sen Machi to eki Hyaku-niju nen. JT Publishing (2009)

External links

JR East Kasugaichō Station

Railway stations in Yamanashi Prefecture
Railway stations in Japan opened in 1954
Chūō Main Line
Stations of East Japan Railway Company
Fuefuki, Yamanashi